Laxman Rao is an Indian writer and tea-seller. The author of over 24 novels, plays and political essays, Rao, a graduate of Delhi University, is also a sidewalk tea-seller in Delhi. Rao says that his books are based on ideas he gets while interacting with his customers and his writings revolve around their personal struggles. But, unlike Rao who is poor, most of the protagonists in his books are rich and well to do. Reviewers have said that his books "exude a rare sense of honesty and humility" and that his "writings are woven around ground realities of life". Rao is also known in Europe, where articles are written about him, e.g. in Germany.

Books and Novels 
Books

 Premchand Ka Vyyaktitva
 The Barrister Gandhi
 Bhartiya Arthshastra
 Pradhanmantri: Indira Gandhi Ke Karyakaal Par Aadharit
 Drishtekonn: Vartamaan Ghatnaon Par Aadharit
 Abhivyaktie: Jwalant Samasyaon Par Aadharit Sahityik Vishleshan
 Adhyapak: Hindi Play
 Mannviki Hindi Sahitya
 Ahannkarr: Satya Ghatnaon Par Aadharit Sahityik Vishleshan
 Betiyoon Ka Astitva: Motivational Book
 Navyuvakon Ka Uttardayitvva: Motivational Book

Novels

 Nai Duniya Ki Nai Kahani (First Novel, 1979)
 Rammdas: Vidyarthi Jeevan Par Aadharit Shikshaprad Upanyas
 Dansh: Samajik Ghatnaon Par Aadharit Prernatmak Upanyas
 Renuu: Mahila Pradhan Prernatmak Upanyas
 Pattiyon Ki Sarsaraahat: Samajik Bandhanon Par Aadharit Maarmik Upanyas
 Narmmada: Prem Prasangon Par Aadharit Maarmik Upanyas
 Love Beyond Social Confines: Romantic Suspense Novel

Awards and recognition 

 Bhartiya Anuvad Parishad

References

Hindi-language writers